The Jackson Avenue Warehouse District is an historic district in the Old City section of Knoxville, Tennessee, USA, listed on the National Register of Historic Places in the 1970s.  The district includes several warehouses along the 100-block of West Jackson Avenue, as well as the Sullivan's Saloon building on East Jackson.  The buildings were listed for their architecture and their role in Knoxville's late-19th and early-20th century wholesaling industry.

The district's original 1973 listing included the warehouses on the north side of West Jackson Avenue (i.e., 103, 121-123, 125-127, and 129-131) and Sullivan's Saloon (100 East Jackson).  In 1975, the district was extended to include the John H. Daniel building (120-122 West Jackson) and the American Clothing Company building (124 West Jackson).  During the 1980s, the north side of West Jackson Avenue's 100-block, along with Sullivan's Saloon and 120-122 West Jackson, were included in the Historic American Buildings Survey.
 
The Jackson Avenue Warehouses represent Knoxville's thriving turn-of-the-century wholesaling sector.  Most of the buildings along the north side of West Jackson were built circa 1890—1910, with loading docks facing the tracks and elaborate Romanesque storefronts facing Jackson Avenue.  Rural merchants would travel to Knoxville via railroad from across East Tennessee to purchase goods and supplies for general stores and other businesses.  Sullivan's Saloon, built in 1888 by Irish-born innkeeper Patrick Sullivan (1840–1925), is one of the few remaining late-19th century saloon buildings in Knoxville.

In 1985, all of the buildings in the Jackson Avenue Warehouse District, along with the remaining historic buildings along West Jackson (all the way to Broadway), the Southern Terminal complex, the 100 blocks of East Jackson, North and South Central, and South Gay, the White Lily factory on Depot, and parts of State and Vine were listed on the Register as the Southern Terminal and Warehouse Historic District.

References

External links

Jackson Avenue Warehouse District — Historic American Buildings Survey files

Buildings and structures in Knoxville, Tennessee
Historic American Buildings Survey in Tennessee
Warehouse districts of the United States
Historic districts on the National Register of Historic Places in Tennessee
National Register of Historic Places in Knoxville, Tennessee